Justin Caruso is an American DJ and record producer based in Los Angeles, California.

Early life and career 

Caruso is the son of billionaire Rick Caruso.

After years of remixes of artists like 3LAU, The Chainsmokers, X Ambassadors and more, Caruso released his debut original "Talk About Me" in early 2017 which charted on Dance/Mix Show Airplay at 36th and received over 2 million streams on Spotify.

In the fall of 2016, Caruso went on his first North American Tour, opening for 3LAU and The Chainsmokers as well as headlining his own shows across the country. After playing at festivals across the country including EDC Las Vegas, Summerfest, and Billboard Hot 100 Fest, he toured nationally with Nghtmre, Valentino Khan, 3LAU, and Tiesto.

Discography

Singles

2017
 "Talk About Me"
 "Love Somebody"
 "Caving"

2018
 "You Got Me" (with Tiësto)
 "More Than a Stranger" (featuring Cappa and Ryan Hicari)
 "High Enough" (featuring Rosie Darling)
 "Don't Know You" (featuring Jake Miller)

2019
 "Better With You" (with 3LAU featuring Iselin)
"Feels So Good" (with Tiësto featuring Kelli-Leigh)
"Good Parts" (featuring Mædi)
"Can't Live Without" (Justin Caruso & Wyn Starks)

2020
"No Eyes On Me"
"Highs & Lows"

2021
"Intoxicated" (Drove & Justin Caruso)

Remixes 
 3LAU and Justin Caruso  – "Better with You" (VIP Remix)
 7715 – "Week"
Marshmello and Anne-Marie – "FRIENDS"
 Two Friends – "With My Homies"
 Oliver Heldens – "Fire in My Soul"
 Kim Petras – "Can't Do Better"
 The Chainsmokers - "Everybody Hates Me"
 The Chainsmokers – "Until You Were Gone"
 Kap Slap and Gazzo – "Rewind"
 Cash Cash – "Aftershock"
 X Ambassadors – "Unsteady"
 Gryffin – "Heading Home"
 The Chainsmokers – "Closer"
 Blink-182 – "All The Small Things"
 Hayley Kiyoko – "Palace"
 Martin Garrix and Bebe Rexha – "In The Name of Love"
 Ben E. King – "Stand By Me"
 The Who – "Baba O'Riley"
 Zedd featuring Selena Gomez – "I Want You To Know"
 Ellie Goulding – "Army"
 3LAU – "Is It Love"
 Lana Del Rey – "High by the Beach"
 Justin Bieber – "What Do You Mean"
 Krewella - "Parachute"

References 

American DJs
American electronic musicians
Electronic dance music DJs
Living people
People from Los Angeles
American people of Italian descent
Year of birth missing (living people)
Caruso family